Pomlewo  is a village in the administrative district of Gmina Przywidz, within Gdańsk County, Pomeranian Voivodeship, in northern Poland.

The village has a population of 435.

See also
 History of Pomerania

References

Pomlewo